The MRC Oxford Institute for Radiation Oncology (formerly the Gray Institute for Radiation Oncology and Biology) is an institute dedicated to research on radiobiology and radiotherapy. It is funded by the Medical Research Council and is based at the University of Oxford's Department of Oncology.

History
The institute was founded as the Gray Laboratory at Mount Vernon Hospital by Louis Harold Gray in 1953  as the world's first radiobiological institute. Early research focused on the oxygen effect to improve radio sensitivity of tumours. The institute at Mount Vernon was home to a unique 4 MeV heavy ion Van de Graaff accelerator.

Research on the effects of oxygenation has continued, as well as other projects and collaborations including work on proton accelerators. The institute remained at Mount Vernon Hospital until 2008 when it relocated to Oxford after the Gray Laboratory Cancer Research Trust became a wholly owned subsidiary of the University.

References

Organisations associated with the University of Oxford
1953 establishments in England
Cancer organisations based in the United Kingdom